Moses Oyiki (born 1 June 1971) is a Nigerian hurdler. He competed in the men's 110 metres hurdles at the 1996 Summer Olympics.

References

1971 births
Living people
Athletes (track and field) at the 1996 Summer Olympics
Nigerian male hurdlers
Olympic athletes of Nigeria
Place of birth missing (living people)
African Games medalists in athletics (track and field)
African Games bronze medalists for Nigeria
Athletes (track and field) at the 1995 All-Africa Games